is a fishing video game developed by Vingt-et-un Systems Corporation and published by Syscom in 1999 and Take-Two Interactive in 2000 for PlayStation.

Reception

The game received "mixed" reviews according to the review aggregation website Metacritic. In Japan, Famitsu gave it a score of 22 out of 40.

Notes

References

External links
 

1999 video games
Fishing video games
PlayStation (console) games
PlayStation (console)-only games
Take-Two Interactive games
Video games developed in Japan